Roots of Blue is an album of duets by Muhal Richard Abrams and Cecil McBee released on the RPR label in 1986.

Reception
The Allmusic review by Brian Olewnick states "Abrams' tendency toward light, single-note runs seems to require more of a weighty counterbalance than McBee offers. Only the title track, a relaxed, languid blues, rises to the level that the listener expects given the caliber of the musicians at hand".

Track listing
All compositions by Muhal Richard Abrams except as indicated
 "Time into Space into Time" (Muhal Richard Abrams, Jason Moran) - 5:47  
 "C.C.'s World" - 7:10  
 "Metamor" - 8:15  
 "Roots of Blue" - 9:00  
 "Direflex" - 9:51

Personnel
Muhal Richard Abrams: piano
Cecil McBee: bass

References

 

1986 albums
Muhal Richard Abrams albums
Cecil McBee albums